"When the Morning Comes" is a song by American country music artist Hoyt Axton. Released in February 1974, it was the first single from his album Life Machine.

The song, which featured a brief solo by Linda Ronstadt (who also provided harmony vocals), peaked at No. 10 on the Billboard Hot Country Singles chart. It also reached No. 1 on the RPM Country Tracks chart in Canada.

Chart performance

References

1974 singles
Hoyt Axton songs
Linda Ronstadt songs
1974 songs
A&M Records singles
Songs written by Hoyt Axton